Early Modern Literary Studies is a peer-reviewed academic journal covering the study of English literature and literary culture in the sixteenth and seventeenth centuries. It was established in 1995 and is published with the support of the Humanities Research Centre at Sheffield Hallam University. The editor in chief is Matthew Steggle.

Literary magazines published in the United Kingdom
English-language journals
Publications established in 1995